Lidudumalingani Mqombothi is a South African writer, film-maker and photographer. His short story "Memories We Lost" won the 2016 Caine Prize for African Writing.

Biography

Lidudumalingani Mqombothi was born in the village of Zikhovane in the Eastern Cape, South Africa. He was the 2016 winner of the Caine Prize for African Writing with his short story "Memories We Lost". As part of winning the prize, he visited Georgetown University in Washington, DC, for a series of events, including seminars and readings. Also in 2016, Lidudumalingani was selected to receive a Miles Morland Scholarship, enabling him to work on his first novel, Let Your Children Name Themselves.

Lidudumalingani was chosen as curator for the 2022 African Book Festival Berlin (26–18 August), with the theme of his programme being titled "Yesterday. Today. Tomorrow."

Awards and honours
2016: Caine Prize winner for Memories We Lost
2016: Miles Morland Scholarship

References

External links
 Official website
 "African Storytelling, Minority and Inclusive Narratives: A Dialogue with Lidudumalingani Mqombothi", Africa in Dialogue, 7 October 2016.
 Siphiwe Mpye, "The Collector | Lidudumalingani Mqombothi" (interview), Noted Man, 31 March 2017.

 

21st-century South African writers
Caine Prize winners
Living people
People from the Eastern Cape
South African male short story writers
South African photographers
South African short story writers
Year of birth missing (living people)